The Other Guys is a 2010 American buddy cop action comedy film directed by Adam McKay, who co-wrote it with Chris Henchy. It stars Will Ferrell and Mark Wahlberg with Eva Mendes, Michael Keaton, Steve Coogan, Ray Stevenson, Samuel L. Jackson and Dwayne Johnson in supporting roles.

This film is the fourth of five collaborations between Ferrell and McKay, following Anchorman: The Legend of Ron Burgundy (2004), Talladega Nights: The Ballad of Ricky Bobby (2006), and Step Brothers (2008), and followed by Anchorman 2: The Legend Continues (2013). The Other Guys is the only one not to be co-written by Ferrell. It is also the first of three collaborations between Ferrell and Wahlberg, who later reunited in Daddy's Home (2015) and Daddy's Home 2 (2017).

The film was released in the United States on August 6, 2010. It was well received by critics and grossed $170 million worldwide.

Plot
Allen Gamble and Terry Hoitz are both officers of the New York City Police Department (NYPD). Allen is a mild-mannered forensic accountant while Terry is a hot-tempered detective who has been partnered with Allen ever since he mistakenly shot Derek Jeter during the World Series, earning him the nickname "Yankee Clipper". They receive no respect from the other officers, particularly fellow detectives Martin and Fosse.

Everyone in their precinct except for Terry idolize cocky detectives Chris Danson and P. K. Highsmith, who are considered New York City's best policemen even though they frequently cause millions of dollars in property damage catching petty criminals. During a pursuit, they leap to their deaths after attempting to "aim for the bushes", which causes the precinct to wonder why they did it and who will take their place.

Allen and Terry investigate a scaffolding permit violation by British multi-billionaire Sir David Ershon but wind up uncovering a much bigger plot by Ershon to cover the losses incurred by his client, Lendl Global. Lendl CEO Pamela Boardman has hired a team of mercenaries led by Roger Wesley to make sure Ershon pays her back.

Terry and Allen go to Allen's house to talk through the case and have dinner. Terry develops a slight crush on Allen's wife Sheila, while not believing she is truly with Allen because of her beauty. When they visit Allen's ex-girlfriend, Christinith, to gain their police evidence, she and her husband want him to have sex with her. Meanwhile, Terry unsuccessfully attempts to reconnect with his ex-fiancée Francine, who had walked out on him due to his anger issues.

During their investigation, Allen and Terry are wounded due to an unsuccessful attempt at scaring them off via the bombing of an accounting office when they come in to investigate it. Allen confides in Terry about how he ran a college dating service in his past, though he insists that he was never a pimp. He stopped the service because he was deep into his dark alternative personality, "Gator", and wound up in the hospital, where he met Sheila. When Sheila tells Allen she is pregnant, he reverts to his dark personality, which causes her to kick him out.

Their investigation comes to a halt when Ershon's attorney, Don Beaman, learns of Ershon's plan to cover his losses, leading Wesley to kill him and make it look like suicide. Angered at their lack of progress, Captain Gene Mauch splits up the partners, sending Terry to traffic duty and Allen to beat patrol.

Despite Terry's anger, Allen still works the case on his own. After he learns that Danson and Highsmith died investigating a staged theft during which Wesley broke into an accounting firm next door, he finds credible evidence and earns his gun back from Mauch. Allen then convinces Terry to rejoin him. They meet Mauch at Bed Bath & Beyond, his second job, where he admits he has been holding off on the case because Ershon has high-profile connections that could ruin him, so he allows them to finish the case off-the-books.

They go to an investment meeting Ershon is having and realize that the $32 billion Ershon seeks is really coming from the NYPD pension fund. They escape with Ershon to his private apartment, and he tells them that the money from the pension fund is already in his account, ready to be transferred. Later that night, Allen and Terry finally reconcile with their loved ones. Allen apologizes to Sheila using her mother as an intermediary and she welcomes him back in. Terry also apologizes to Francine for letting his anger rule his life.

The next morning, they drive to the bank to stop the transfer, evading Wesley's team, groups of Chechen and Nigerian "investors" to whom Ershon owes money, and police officers who are told Allen and Terry have gone rogue. Reaching the bank, they halt the transfer. Wesley arrives and, as a delaying tactic, shoots both officers and Ershon in their arms. Mauch finally arrives with backup, rescuing them and arresting Ershon for embezzlement, and Wesley for multiple counts of murder. Ershon's arrest leads to a stock market crash and the subsequent federal bailout of Lendl Global.

Terry marries Francine, and Allen reunites with his wife. The narrator finishes off by stating that the true heroes are the everyday people who work to make a difference, not the ones who appear in the newspaper or on television.

Cast
 Will Ferrell as Detective Allen "Gator" Gamble
 Mark Wahlberg as Detective Terry Hoitz
 Eva Mendes as Dr. Sheila Ramos Gamble
 Michael Keaton as Captain Gene Mauch
 Steve Coogan as Sir David Ershon
 Ray Stevenson as Roger Wesley
 Samuel L. Jackson as Detective P.K. Highsmith
 Dwayne Johnson as Detective Christopher Danson
 Lindsay Sloane as Francine
 Natalie Zea as Christinith
 Rob Riggle as Detective Evan Martin
 Damon Wayans Jr. as Detective Fosse
 Viola Harris as Mama Ramos
 Rob Huebel as Officer Watts
 Brett Gelman as Hal
 Bobby Cannavale as Jimmy
 Andy Buckley as Don Beaman
 Ben Schwartz as Beaman's Assistant
 Adam McKay as Dirty Mike
 Zach Woods as Douglas
 Chris Gethard as Clerk
 Zoe Lister-Jones as Therapist
 Michael Delaney as Bob Littleford
 Tess Kartel as Brazilian woman

Cameos
 Anne Heche as Pamela Boardman (uncredited)
 Ice-T as Narrator (voice)  (uncredited)
 Horatio Sanz as gallery owner
 Thomas Middleditch as gallery attendee
 Derek Jeter as himself
 Brooke Shields as herself
 Rosie Perez as herself
 Tracy Morgan as himself
 Monty Sopp as Kip James (uncredited)
 Brian James as BG James (uncredited)
 Josef Sommer as District Attorney Radford (uncredited)

Production
McKay described the genesis as an "accident, in a way", stemming from a dinner he and Ferrell had with Wahlberg. After noticing the actors' chemistry, McKay wrote producer Kevin Messick an email hypothesizing a possible film starring the two, giving a cop film as an example of what he thought would work. Messick suggested developing that idea into a film.

Principal photography for the film began on September 23, 2009, in New York City. Additional scenes were filmed in Albany and Staten Island, New York.

Practical visual effects work, including the helicopter crash scene, was done by KernerFX.

Stunt coordinator Brad Martin said in a Wall Street Journal interview that for Gamble's car they used three Priuses, including one with a racing engine so large it had to go in the back seat.

Release

In July 2010, Wahlberg and Ferrell appeared at the San Diego Comic-Con International to promote the film.

During an episode of Big Brother, the house guests competed in a luxury challenge to see an advance screening of the film. Although they weren't actually in the house, both Will Ferrell and Mark Wahlberg made an on-screen video appearance.

During the August 4, 2010 episode of America's Got Talent, the week's contestants saw an advance screening of the film and met Ferrell and Wahlberg.

Ferrell and Wahlberg also made a cameo appearance on an episode of WWE Raw to promote the film.

During the week leading up to the release date, the film was promoted on TruTV programs, specifically The Smoking Gun Presents: World's Dumbest.... During the Season 2 premier for the MTV reality series Jersey Shore on July 29, 2010, special segments were shown during the commercial breaks of the show's cast broken down on a highway, discussing several movies, as part of a promotional tie-in; with The Other Guys being one of them.

They appeared in on screen advertising on broadcast sports events like MLB and NASCAR.

Reception

Box office
In its first day of release, The Other Guys grossed $13.1 million, placing first for Friday. It had a large opening weekend take of $35.5 million, placing it at #1 for the weekend of August 6–8, 2010, unseating Inception. The film ended up grossing $119.2 million in North America and $51.7 million in other territories, making for a worldwide total of $170.9 million.

Critical reception
On review aggregator Rotten Tomatoes, the film holds an approval rating of 78% based on 205 reviews, with an average rating of 6.7/10. The site's critical consensus reads: "A clever parody of cop-buddy action-comedies, The Other Guys delivers several impressive action set pieces and lots of big laughs, thanks to the assured comic chemistry between Will Ferrell and Mark Wahlberg." On Metacritic, the film was assigned a weighted average score of 64 out of 100, based on 35 critics, indicating "generally favorable reviews". Audiences polled by CinemaScore gave the film an average grade of "B−" on an A+ to F scale.

The film was praised as "a highly entertaining movie filled with witty dialogue and over-the-top action." Peter Travers of Rolling Stone praised the film, saying, "Don't let anyone spoil the wildly hilarious surprises. Ferrell and Wahlberg will double your fun. Guaranteed." Some critics praised The Other Guys as the best police film of the year, comparing the film to the critically panned Cop Out, with Richard Roeper stating, "Note to Kevin Smith: THIS is how you do a spoof of the buddy-cop genre," and Stephen Whitty of The Star-Ledger said in his mixed review, "Measured against this year's other police farce—remember Cop Out?—it looks absolutely heroic."

The Other Guys also received the "Best Comedy Film" award for 2010 at the first annual Comedy Awards.

Accolades

See also
 Buddy cop film
 Ponzi scheme

References

External links

 
 
 

2010 films
2010 action comedy films
2010s buddy comedy films
2010s buddy cop films
American action comedy films
American buddy comedy films
American buddy cop films
Columbia Pictures films
Fictional portrayals of the New York City Police Department
Films directed by Adam McKay
Films produced by Will Ferrell
Films scored by Jon Brion
Films set in New York City
Films shot in New York City
Gary Sanchez Productions films
2010s police comedy films
Films with screenplays by Adam McKay
2010 comedy films
2010s English-language films
2010s American films